Gailes railway station is located on the Main line in Queensland, Australia. Despite the name, it is not in the suburb of Gailes, City of Ipswich, but in the neighbouring suburb in Wacol, City of Brisbane. In 1919, the station was named Dingo Hill and renamed in 1925 to Gailes.

Services
Gailes is served by trains operating to and from Ipswich and Rosewood. Most city-bound services run to Caboolture and Nambour, with some morning peak trains terminating at Bowen Hills. Some afternoon inbound services on weekdays run to Kippa-Ring. Gailes is 23 minutes from Ipswich and 34 minutes on an all-stops train from Central.

Services by platform

*Note: One weekday morning service (4:56am from Central) and selected afternoon peak services continue through to Rosewood.  At all other times, a change of train is required at Ipswich.

References

External links

[ Gailes station] TransLink
Gailes station Queensland's Railways on the Internet

Railway stations in Ipswich City
Wacol, Queensland
Railway stations in Brisbane
Main Line railway, Queensland